The Sundøy Bridge is a cantilever bridge in the municipality of Leirfjord in Nordland county, Norway. The concrete bridge connects the mainland to the village of Sundøy on the island of Alsta.

The Sundøy Bridge was opened on 9 August 2003. It was designed by Jan-Eirik Nilsskog.  The bridge cost . The decision to spend such an amount of money on a bridge to a place with less than 150 inhabitants was disputed. However, Sundøy did not get connected to the mainland when the rest of Alsten did, following the opening of the Helgeland Bridge in 1991. This was because Seven Sisters mountains separate the two sides of the island with no roads crossing them. Consequently, the people at Sundøy thought it was only fair that they got their connection as well.

See also
List of bridges in Norway
List of bridges in Norway by length
List of bridges
List of bridges by length

References

External links
A page about the Sundøy Bridge (in Norwegian)
Links to more pages about and pictures of the bridge

Leirfjord
Road bridges in Nordland
Bridges completed in 2003
2003 establishments in Norway